Varenne or La Varenne may refer to:

Varenne, a race horse

Places in France

 La Varenne-Saint-Hilaire, a village in the commune of Saint-Maur-des-Fossés, Val-de-Marne department
 La Varenne, Maine-et-Loire, a commune in the Maine-et-Loire department
 Varenne-l'Arconce, a commune in the Saône-et-Loire department
 Varenne-Saint-Germain, a commune in the Saône-et-Loire department
 Varenne (Paris Métro), a metro station in Paris
 La Varenne–Chennevières station, a railway station in the Val-de-Marne department

Rivers in France
 Varenne (Arques), a tributary of the Arques in the Seine-Maritime department
 Varenne (Mayenne), a tributary of the Mayenne in the Orne and Mayenne departments

People with the surname
 François Pierre La Varenne (1618–1678), French author
 Guillaume Fouquet de la Varenne (1560–1616), French statesman
 Alex Varenne, French comic book artist and writer
 Gaëtan Varenne, football player
 Jean Varenne, French indologist

See also 
 Varennes (disambiguation)